A number of common weeding tools are designed to ease the task of removing weeds from gardens and lawns.

Tool types 
 The fulcrum head weeder has a split tip like a serpent's tongue, and a long thin handle.  Many models have a curved piece of metal along the handle which is put against the ground while the tip is digging.  The curved metal piece acts as a fulcrum in a lever system.  It is helpful to remove weeds either with a tap root or a fibrous root system.
 The Cape Cod weeder has a long, thin handle and a triangular scraping head.  When the handle is held parallel to the ground, the head points downward.
 The crack weeder is a relative of the Cape Cod Weeder. It is designed to scrape out weeds growing in crevices, stone walls and other deep and narrow places.  The plane of the L-shaped scraping blade includes the handle; the bottom of the "L" is parallel to it.
 Guna is a short traditional knife with a wide flat tip used for digging and weeding in the Philippines.
 Homi is a short-handled traditional weeding and ploughing tool used by Korean People.

See also 
 Hoe

References

Bibliography

William Bryant Logan, Smith & Hawken The Tool Book, 1997

Gardening tools